"Say No Go" is a single by De La Soul from their influential 1989 album 3 Feet High and Rising. It reached number 18 in the UK charts. The tune is heavily based on sampling the hit song "I Can't Go for That (No Can Do)" by Hall & Oates.

Background
The song is a cautionary tale about the use of drugs, in particular "base" (otherwise known as crack cocaine); a topic they would tackle on their follow up album, De La Soul Is Dead, albeit from 
a different perspective, on the song "My Brother's a Basehead".

In the opening line, Posdnuos raps: "Now let's get right on down to the skit / A baby is brought into a world of pits / And if it could've talked that soon / In the delivery room / It would've asked the nurse for a hit".

"Say No Go" was also a popular dance song and the instrumental for the song has been used on TV show The Fresh Prince of Bel-Air.

Track listing
 "Say No Go (Say No Dope Mix)" - 6:15
 "Say No Go (New Keys Vocal)" - 4:51
 "Say No Go (Radio Mix)" - 4:21
 "The Mack Daddy on the Left" - 2:33
Guest Appearance: Chi Ali
 "Say No Go (New Keys Instrumental)" - 5:01

Samples
"Say No Go" includes samples from the following songs:
Hall & Oates: "I Can't Go for That (No Can Do)"
Sly Stone: "Crossword Puzzle"
The Detroit Emeralds: "Baby Let Me Take You (In My Arms)"
Emotions: "Best of My Love"
Funky 4 + 1: "That's The Joint"
The Turtles: "I'm Chief Kamanawanalea (We're the Royal Macadamia Nuts)"
Walter Schumann: "Dragnet (theme music)"

Charts

See also
Just Say No

1989 singles
De La Soul songs
Songs written by George Clinton (funk musician)
Song recordings produced by Prince Paul (producer)
Music videos directed by Mark Pellington
Black-and-white music videos
1989 songs
Songs about drugs
Songs about cocaine
Protest songs
Tommy Boy Records singles
Songs written by Vincent Mason
Songs written by Kelvin Mercer
Songs written by David Jude Jolicoeur
Songs written by Prince Paul (producer)